Aviation Parkway may refer to:
Aviation Parkway (Ottawa)
Aviation Parkway (Raleigh-Durham)
Arizona State Route 210 in Tucson, named Aviation Parkway